John Vowles House is two adjoined historic homes located at Charlottesville, Virginia. It was built in 1824, and consists of two two-story, three-bay, gable-roofed Federal style brick town houses. Both houses feature decorative cornices and original interior woodwork.  To the rear of 1113 West Main is a small -story, "L"-shaped, gable-roofed brick outbuilding built as a kitchen and added in the 1920s.

It was listed on the National Register of Historic Places in 1989.

References

External links

Vowles Townhouses, 1111-1113 West Main Street, Charlottesville, Charlottesville, VA: 10 measured drawings at Historic American Buildings Survey
https://www.dhr.virginia.gov/VLR_to_transfer/PDFNoms/104-0040_Vowles,John,House_1989_Final_Nomination.pdf

Historic American Buildings Survey in Virginia
Houses on the National Register of Historic Places in Virginia
Federal architecture in Virginia
Houses completed in 1824
Houses in Charlottesville, Virginia
National Register of Historic Places in Charlottesville, Virginia